Conrad Mewse (born 21 April 1999) is a British professional Motocross racer. He has previously competed full-time in the MX2 class of the FIM Motocross World Championship. He was the 2013 FIM Junior Motocross world champion in the 85cc class. In the same season he was also able to bring home the European Motocross Championship in the 85cc class.

Mewse represented his country at the Motocross des Nations in 2021, helping them to finish third overall.
 
In addition to this, he is a three-time British Motocross Champion in the MX2 class, winning his most recent one in 2022.

Career

Junior career 
Mewse had a successful international junior career, particularly when he was in the 85cc class. In 2012, the European Motocross Championship for the 85cc class (known as EMX85), was held as a single round event at the Matterley Basin track in his native Britain. Mewse achieved pole position in the class by winning the qualifying race and was leading the first race until a puncture forced him to finish in 13th. A win in the second race was enough for him to take the bronze medal in EMX85 for 2012 behind Davy Pootjes and David Herbreteau.
This was coupled with finishing 10th overall in the 85cc class of the FIM Motocross Junior World Championship in the same year.

In 2013, Mewse became the Junior World Champion in the 85cc class at Jinín in Czech Republic by placing second in both races. In doing so he became the first British junior world champion in any class since 2005. Two weeks later he was able to add the European 85cc title to his world title at Matterley Basin, winning both races in the process.

The next step for Mewse was to move up to the 125cc class in 2014. His first year saw him finish 26th overall in the 125 class of the Junior World Championship, held that year at Lierneux in Belgium. This was coupled with finishing 27th overall in the EMX125 European Championship series, with a best race finish of seventh. 2015 saw Mewse take a big step forward on the 125, finishing second overall in the Junior World Championship behind future world champion Maxime Renaux, when the event was staged in El Molar in Spain. In the EMX125 championship, Mewse fourth in the final standings – winning the final race of the season at Assen in Netherlands. His 2015 season was capped off by becoming Dutch Open Champion in the 125 class.

250 career 
On the back of his successful 2015 season, Mewse was signed by the factory Rockstar Energy Husqvarna team to compete in the EMX250 European Championship for 2016. His season started in the best way when he won the opening round of the season at Valkenswaard, taking both race wins in the process. Following this strong start to the season, Rockstar Energy Husqvarna promoted Mewse to the MX2 class of the 2016 FIM Motocross World Championship. Initially this change proved a big step for Mewse, but in the second half of the season he was able to post some impressive results – including a fifth place in race one at his home round. Despite missing seven rounds of the year this was good enough for him to finish 19th in the final standings.

Mewse was retained by the Rockstar Energy Husqvarna team in the MX2 world championship for 2017. This proved to be an up and down season for Mewse, finishing 16th in the final standings – picking up his first world championship top-three race finish in Latvia on the way.

For 2018, Mewse signed with the Hitachi KTM UK team to continue to contest the MX2 world championship as well as the British Motocross Championship in the MX2 class. In the world championship, Mewse had a competitive start to the season, with several top-6 race finishes and a fourth place overall finish at Valkenswaard. This resulted in a 12th-place position in the final standings, despite missing several rounds. Domestically, Mewse won his first national MX2 title picking up four overall wins and nine race wins along the way. A wrist injury at round three of the 2019 British Motocross Championship meant that he missed most of the season after a strong start to his national title defence, with one round win and four race wins.

The COVID-19 affected 2020 season saw Mewse pick up his best overall finish in the MX2 world championship standings, finishing eighth overall with two third place race finishes being his best results. With no British Championship being held in 2020, it would take until 2021 for Mewse to win back his MX2 British crown. His world championship campaign was more tough experience as he dropped back to 16th in the final standings, missing three rounds along the way. Mewse received his first call-up to represent Great Britain at the annual Motocross des Nations in 2021, where his performance as the MX2 class rider helped the team secure second overall.

2022 was set to be Mewse's last year in the MX2 class. He was scheduled to compete again with the Hitachi KTM squad but a few months before the start of the season Mewse left the team. Working under his own privateer 426 Motorsports banner Mewse was able to capture his third British title with four overall wins and eight race wins. His MX2 world championship campaign came to an end mid-season after he dislocated his wrist following a crash at the British Championship. After recovering from this injury moved up to the MXGP category, making his debut for the Diga Procross KTM Racing replacing the injured Thomas Kjær Olsen. After racing three rounds without scoring points the partnership came to an end.

450 career 
For 2023, Mewse has signed with the Crendon Fastrack Honda team to focus on the MX1 British Championship.

Honours 
Motocross des Nations
 Team Overall: 2021  
FIM Junior Motocross World Championship
 85cc class: 2013 
 125cc class: 2015 
European Motocross Championship
 85cc class: 2013 , 2012 
British Motocross Championship
 MX2 class: 2018, 2021 & 2022 
Dutch Open Motocross Championship
 125cc class: 2015

Career Statistics

Motocross des Nations

FIM Motocross World Championship

By season

References

Living people
1999 births
British motocross riders